Over 100 species of ants can be found in the Midwestern state of Kansas.

Kansas ants
Kansas ant species include common ants and ones with wings. Some Kansas ants create mounds that are a common sight - Pogonomyrmex occidentalis, Formica subsericea, Formica montana, and Formica planipilis.
 
Ants of the subfamily Dolichoderinae are frequently found in Kansas. Dolichoderinae ants may be the only ants that can survive in Kansas' harsher environments.
  
Ants of the former subfamily Ecitoninae (now Dorylinae) mostly go unnoticed in Kansas because they can not tolerate direct sunlight. Neivamyrmex nigrescens and Neivamyrmex opacithorax are the most commonly found ants of this rarely seen subfamily.

Crematogaster punctulata and Monomorium minimum of the subfamily Myrmicinae are frequently found in Kansas while many others are not as abundant.

The only ant of the subfamily Ponerinae that is found in all of Kansas is Hypoponera opacior. Despite Ponera pennsylvanica not being found statewide, the species is also commonly found in Kansas along with Hypoponera opacior.

Ants of the subfamily Formicinae are the second most abundant species in Kansas, right after Myrmicinae ants. Ants in the genus Camponotus and Formica are the most commonly found in this subfamily.

Kansas ants as pests
Ants that are commonly called pests are red imported fire ants, acrobat ants, big-headed ants, carpenter ants, cornfield ants, harvester ants, larger yellow ant, little black ants, mound ants, spinewaisted ants, and thief ants. It is known that these pest species can survive through Kansas' less harsh winters.

List
Acanthomyops claviger
Acanthomyops interjectus
Acanthomyops latipes
Amblyopone pallipes
Aphaenogaster fulva
Aphaenogaster mariae
Aphaenogaster rudis
Aphaenogaster tennesseensis
Aphaenogaster texana
Aphaenogaster treatae pluteicornis
Brachymyrmex depilis
Camponotus americanus
Camponotus caryae
Camponotus castaneus
Camponotus decipiens
Camponotus discolor
Camponotus ferrugineus
Camponotus impressus
Camponotus nearcticus
Camponotus pennsylvanicus 
Camponotus sayi
Camponotus vicinus
Crematogaster ashmeadi
Crematogaster cerasi
Crematogaster clara
Crematogaster laeviuscula
Crematogaster lineolata
Crematogaster minutissima missouriensis
Crematogaster punctulata
Dolichoderus mariae
Dorymyrmex flavus
Dorymyrmex insanus
Forelius
Formica bradleyi
Formica canadensis
Formica emeryi
Formica exsectoides
Formica montana
Formica neogagates
Formica neorufibarbis
Formica ntidiventris
Formica pallidefulva
Formica perpilosa
Formica planipilis
Formica schaufussi dolosa
Formica subintegra
Formica subsericea
Harpagoxenus americanus
Hypoponera opacior
Lasius alienus
Lasius flavus
Lasius neoniger
Lasius speculiventris
Lasius umbratus
Leptothorax ambiguus
Leptothorax curvispinosus
Leptothorax pergandei
Leptothorax schaumi
Leptothorax tricarinatus
Monomorium minimum
Monomorium pharaonis
Myrmeceocystus mimicus
Myrmeceocystus navajo
Myrmeceocystus romainei
Myrmecina americana
Myrmica americana
Myrmica punctiventris
Neivamyrmex carolinensis
Neivamyrmex fallax
Neivamyrmex fuscipennis
Neivamyrmex minor
Neivamyrmex nigrescens
Neivamyrmex opacithorax
Paratrechina parvula
Paratrechina terricola
Paratrechina vividula
Pheidole bicarinata
Pheidole dentata
Pheidole desertorum
Pheidole pilifera coloradensis
Pheidole pilifera pilifera
Pheidole senex
Pheidole sitarches campestris
Pogonomyrmex apache
Pogonomyrmex barbatus
Pogonomyrmex comanche
Pogonomyrmex maricopa
Pogonomyrmex occidentalis 
Pogonomyrmex rugosus
Polyergus breviceps
Ponera pennsylvanica
Prenolepis imparis
Proceratium pergandei
Proceratium sileeeeceum
Smithistruma dietrichi
Smithistruma laevinasis
Smithistruma ohioensis
Smithistruma pilinasis
Smithistruma pulchella
Smithistruma reflexa
Solenopsis molesta
Solenopsis texana
Solenopsis xyloni
Stenamma brevicorne
Tapinoma melanocephalum
Tapinoma sessile

References

Kansas
Ants
Kansas
L